Åse Fosli (8 June 1924 – 1 June 2009) was a Norwegian politician for the Conservative Party.

She served as a deputy representative to the Parliament of Norway from Troms during the terms 1977–1981 and 1981–1985. In total she met during 8 days of parliamentary session.

References

1924 births
2009 deaths
Deputy members of the Storting
Conservative Party (Norway) politicians
Troms politicians
Women members of the Storting
20th-century Norwegian women politicians
20th-century Norwegian politicians